Leila Meskhi was the defending champion but did not compete that year.

Julie Halard-Decugis won in the final 6–1, 6–2 against Mana Endo.

Seeds
A champion seed is indicated in bold text while text in italics indicates the round in which that seed was eliminated.

  Judith Wiesner (quarterfinals)
  Barbara Paulus (first round)
  Yayuk Basuki (second round)
  Yone Kamio (first round)
  Kyoko Nagatsuka (first round)
  Sabine Hack (second round)
  Elena Likhovtseva (second round)
  Ai Sugiyama (quarterfinals)

Draw

External links
1996 Schweppes Tasmanian International Draw

Singles
Hobart International – Singles